Amateur journalism is a hobby for starting small newspapers established after the U.S. Civil War, using small and inexpensive printing presses. Local circulation and exchanges, sometimes among associations were done. Conventions were also held. The hobby waxed and waned in the early 20th century, achieving a literary peak under the influence of H. P. Lovecraft and W. Paul Cook in the 1915-1925 period. The 1930s brought a redevelopment of interest with a mix of fine printing with quality material and crude leaflets from small hand-presses and mimeographs.
Membership in associations has diminished to the hundreds in the United States and Canada and many are elderly as safety rules for motorized presses and hand-setting type have become lost arts. Citizen journalism and blogging have come with the advent of the internet, however.

Retired Tampa Tribune reporter Leland Hawes is an aficionado.

References

Types of journalism
Hobbies